Þjóðveldisbærinn Stöng (Stöng Commonwealth Farm) is a reconstructed viking-era farmstead in Iceland, located in the Þjórsárdalur valley near road 32 in Árnessýsla county. It is a historically accurate reconstruction of the three buildings, including a longhouse, which stood 7 km to the north at Stöng; the farm is believed to have been buried under volcanic ash in 1104 following the eruption of the volcano Hekla.

The reconstruction was built in 1974 as a part of the national celebrations of the 1100th anniversary of the settlement of Iceland in 874.

External links

Museums in Iceland
Archaeological sites in Iceland
Former populated places in Iceland
History museums in Iceland